Babe Ruth's called shot is the home run hit by Babe Ruth of the New York Yankees against the Chicago Cubs in the fifth inning of Game 3 of the 1932 World Series, held on October 1, 1932, at Wrigley Field in Chicago. During the at-bat, Ruth made a pointing gesture which the existing film confirms, but whether he was promising a home run, or gesturing at fans or the other team, remains in dispute.

Event
There is no dispute over the general events of the moment. All the reports say that the Cubs "bench jockeys" were riding Ruth mercilessly and that Ruth, rather than ignoring them, was "playing" with them through words and gestures. 
With the score tied 4-4 in the fifth inning of game three, Ruth took strike one from pitcher Charlie Root. As the Cubs players heckled Ruth and the fans hurled insults, Ruth held up his hand pointing at either Root, the Cubs dugout, or center field. Ruth took strike two, and then he repeated this pointing gesture. 

It is unclear if Ruth pointed to the center field, to Root, or to the Cubs bench. In the 1990s, amateur filmmaker Matt Miller Kandle, Sr.'s film of the at-bat was discovered, but the film did not provide anything conclusive. In 2020, an audio clip was discovered from a radio show originally aired on October 6, 1932. In the audio clip, Lou Gehrig said that Ruth was indeed pointing toward the flagpole in center field.

Root's next pitch was a curveball, and Ruth hit it to the deepest part of the center-field near the flag pole. Estimates of the distance vary up to 490 feet. The ground distance to the center-field corner, somewhat right of straightaway center was 440 feet. The ball landed a little bit to the right of the 440 corners and farther back, apparently in the temporary seating in Sheffield Avenue behind the permanent interior bleacher seats. Calling the game over the radio, broadcaster Tom Manning shouted, "The ball is going, going, going, high into the center-field stands...and it is a home run!" Ruth himself later described the hit as "past the flagpole" which stood behind the scoreboard and the 440 corners. Ruth's powerful hit was aided by a strong carrying wind that day.

Newsreel footage, available in MLB's 100 Years of the World Series, showed that Ruth was crowding the plate and nearly stepped forward out of the batter's box, inches away from the risk of being called out (Rule 6.06a). The film also shows that as he rounded first base, Ruth looked toward the Cubs dugout and made a waving-off gesture with his left hand; then as he approached third, he made another mocking gesture, a two-armed "push" motion, toward the suddenly quiet Cubs bench. Many reports have claimed that Ruth "thumbed his nose" at the Cubs dugout, but the existing newsreel footage does not show that. (If it occurred, it might have been considered vulgar and could have been edited out.) 

Attending the game was Franklin D. Roosevelt, then a presidential candidate, as well as future Associate Justice of the United States Supreme Court John Paul Stevens (at the time a twelve-year-old boy). Roosevelt reportedly laughed while watching Ruth run the bases. 

When Ruth crossed home plate, he could no longer hide his smile, and he was patted by his exuberant teammates when he reached the Yankees dugout.

Root remained in the game but for only one more pitch, which the next batter, Lou Gehrig, hit into the right-field seats for his second home run of the day. The Yankees won the game 7–5 and the next day they finished off the Cubs 13–6, completing a four-game sweep of the World Series.

Origins of the called-shot story
Ruth's second home run in Game 3 of the 1932 World Series may have been a mere footnote in history had it not been for reporter Joe Williams, a respected but opinionated sports editor for the Scripps-Howard newspapers. In a late edition the same day of the game, Williams wrote this headline that appeared in the New York World-Telegram, evoking billiards terminology: "RUTH CALLS SHOT AS HE PUTS HOME RUN NO. 2 IN SIDE POCKET." Williams' summary of the story read: "In the fifth, with the Cubs riding him unmercifully from the bench, Ruth pointed to center and punched a screaming liner to a spot where no ball had been hit before." Williams' article is believed to have been the only one written on the day of the game that referred to Ruth's act of pointing to center field. The wide circulation of the Scripps-Howard newspapers most likely gave the story life, as many read Williams' article and assumed that it was accurate. Several days later, other stories appeared stating that Ruth had called his shot, a few even written by reporters who were not at the game. The story was likely to meet with acceptance among the public, who were aware of Ruth's many larger-than-life achievements and his well-publicized fulfilled promise to sick child Johnny Sylvester that he would hit a home run.

At the time, Ruth did not clarify the matter, initially stating that he was merely pointing toward the Cubs' dugout to remind them that he still had one more strike. At one point very early on, he said, "It's in the papers, isn't it?" In an interview with Chicago sports reporter John Carmichael, Ruth said that he had not pointed to any particular spot, but that he just wanted to give the ball a good ride. Soon, however, the media-savvy Ruth was going along with the story that he had called his shot, and his subsequent versions over the years became more dramatic. "In the years to come, Ruth publicly claimed that he did, indeed, point to where he planned to send the pitch." For one newsreel, Ruth voiced over the called shot scene with the remarks, "Well, I looked out at center field and I pointed. I said, 'I'm gonna hit the next pitched ball right past the flagpole!' Well, the good Lord must have been with me." In his 1948 autobiography, Ruth provided another enhanced version by stating that he had told his wife "I'll belt one where it hurts them the most" and that the idea of calling his own shot then came to him. Ruth then recounts the at-bat:

Ruth explained that he was upset about the Cubs' insults during the series, and that he was especially upset that Chicago fans had spat upon his wife Claire. Ruth not only said that he had deliberately pointed to center with two strikes, he said that he had pointed to center even before Root's first pitch.

Others helped perpetuate the story over the years. Tom Meany, who worked for Joe Williams at the time of the called shot, later wrote a popular but often embellished 1947 biography of Ruth. In the book, Meany wrote, "He pointed to center field. Some say it was merely as a gesture towards Root, others that he was just letting the Cubs bench know that he still had one big one left. Ruth himself has changed his version a couple of times... Whatever the intent of the gesture, the result was, as they say in Hollywood, slightly colossal."

Despite writing the article that may have begun the legend, over the ensuing years, Williams came to doubt the veracity of Ruth's called shot.

Another story from baseball folklore tells that Ruth's attitude toward the Cubs was rooted in his anger that his ex-Yankee teammate Mark Koenig, now with the Cubs, was denied a full World Series share.

Nonetheless, the called shot further became etched as truth into the minds of thousands of people after the 1948 film The Babe Ruth Story, which starred William Bendix as Ruth. The film took its material from Ruth's autobiography, and hence did not question the veracity of the called shot. Two separate biographical films made in the 1990s also repeated this gesture in an unambiguous way, coupled with Ruth hitting the ball over the famous ivy-covered wall, which did not actually exist at Wrigley Field until five years later.

Eyewitness accounts

Eyewitness accounts were equally inconclusive and widely varied, with some of the opinions possibly skewed by partisanship.

 "Don't let anybody tell you differently. Babe definitely pointed." — Cubs public-address announcer Pat Pieper (As public-address announcer Pieper sat next to the wall separating the field from the stands, between home plate and third base. In 1966 he spoke with the Chicago Tribune "In the Wake of the News" sports columnist David Condon: "Pat remembers sitting on the third base side and hearing [Cubs' pitcher] Guy Bush chide Ruth, who had taken two strikes. According to Pat, Ruth told Bush: 'That's strike two, all right. But watch this.' 'Then Ruth pointed to center field, and hit his homer,' Pat continued. 'You bet your life Babe Ruth called it.'")
 "My dad took me to see the World Series, and we were sitting behind third base, not too far back.... Ruth did point to the center-field scoreboard. And he did hit the ball out of the park after he pointed with his bat. So it really happened," stated former Associate Justice John Paul Stevens, United States Supreme Court.
 "What do you think of the nerve of that big monkey. Imagine the guy calling his shot and getting away with it." – Lou Gehrig
 The Commissioner of Baseball, Kenesaw Mountain Landis, attended the game with his young nephew, and both had a clear view of the action at home plate. Landis himself never commented on whether he believed Ruth called the shot, but his nephew believes that Ruth did not call it.
Shirley Povich, The Washington Post columnist, interviewed Hall-of-Fame catcher Bill Dickey. "Ruth was just mad about that quick pitch, Dickey explained.  He was pointing at Root, not at the centerfield stands.  He called him a couple of names and said, "Don't do that to me anymore, you blankety-blank."
Ray Kelly, Ruth's guest for the game, said, "He absolutely did it ... I was right there. Never in doubt."
Erle V. Painter, the Yankees athletic trainer at the time, shared his recollection of the shot with the Baseball Hall of Fame. He stated, "Ruth made a three-quarter turn to the stands and held up one finger. It was plain he was signifying one strike didn't mean he was out. Root put over another strike and the Babe repeated the pantomime, holding up two fingers this time. Then, before taking his stance, he swept his left arm full length and pointed to the centerfield fence."

The called shot particularly irked Root. He had a fine career, winning over 200 games, but he would be forever remembered as the pitcher who gave up the "called shot", much to his annoyance. When he was asked to play himself in the 1948 film The Babe Ruth Story, Root turned it down when he learned that Ruth's pointing to center field would be in the film. Said Root, "Ruth did not point at the fence before he swung. If he had made a gesture like that, well, anybody who knows me knows that Ruth would have ended up on his ass [via a brushback pitch]. The legend didn't get started until later." Root's teammate, catcher Gabby Hartnett, also denied that Ruth called the shot.  On the other hand, according to baseball historian and author Michael Bryson, it is noted that at that point in the game, Ruth pointed toward the outfield to draw attention to a loose board that was swinging free.  Some people may have misinterpreted this as a "called shot", but Cubs personnel knew exactly what he was pointing to, and hammered the board back into place.

In 1942, during the making of The Pride of the Yankees, Babe Herman (who was at that time a teammate of Root with the minor league Hollywood Stars) was on the movie set as a double for both Ruth (who played himself in most scenes) and Gary Cooper (who played Lou Gehrig). Herman re-introduced Root and Ruth on set and the following exchange (later recounted by Herman to baseball historian Donald Honig) took place:
 Root: "You never pointed out to center field before you hit that ball off me, did you?"
 Ruth: "I know I didn't, but it made a hell of a story, didn't it?"

Root went to his grave vehemently denying that Ruth ever pointed to center field.

Rediscovered 16-mm films

In the 1970s, a 16-mm home movie of the called shot surfaced, and some believed that it might put an end to the decades-old controversy. The film was shot by an amateur filmmaker named Matt Miller Kandle, Sr. Only family and friends had seen the film until the late 1980s. Two frames from the film were published in the 1988 book Babe Ruth: A Life in Pictures by Lawrence S. Ritter and Mark Rucker on p. 206. The film was broadcast on a February 1994 Fox television program called Front Page. Later in 1994, still images from the film appeared in filmmaker Ken Burns' documentary film Baseball.

The film was shot from the grandstands behind home plate, off to the third base side. One can clearly see Ruth's gesture, although it is hard to determine the angle by which he is pointing. Some contend that Ruth's extended arm is pointing more to the left-field direction, toward the Cubs bench, which would be consistent with his continued gesturing toward the bench while rounding the bases after the home run. Others who have studied the film closely assert that in addition to the broader gestures, Ruth did quickly point his finger in the direction of Cubs pitcher Charlie Root or toward center field just as Root was winding up.

In 1999, another 16-mm film of the called shot appeared. This film was shot by inventor Harold Warp during the only major league baseball game that he ever attended. The rights to his footage were sold to ESPN, which aired it as part of the network's SportsCentury program in 2000. Warp's film has not been as widely seen by the public as has Kandle's film, but many of those who have seen it feel that it shows that Ruth did not call his shot. The film shows the action much more clearly than does the Kandle film, showing Ruth visibly shouting something either at Root or at the Cubs dugout while pointing.

The authors of the book Yankees Century believe that the Warp film proves conclusively that the home run was not a "called shot." However, Leigh Montville's 2006 book The Big Bam asserts that neither film answers the question definitively.

Legacy and cultural references
Major league slugger Jim Thome used a similar bat-pointing gesture as part of his normal preparation for an at-bat.

In the 1984 film The Natural, The Whammer, played by Joe Don Baker and modeled after Babe Ruth, makes a gesture with his bat that closely mimics the Ruth gesture. He then swings and strikes out.

The climax of the 1989 film Major League depicts Indians catcher Jake Taylor pointing toward the outfield, clearly making a reference to Ruth's called shot. However, Taylor bunts the next pitch in a squeeze play that scores the winning run from second base.

It is on loan to the New York Yankees Museum.

References

Bibliography

External links
BB Moments: Ruth's Called Shot, 10/01/32 (MLB.com)
Babe Ruth – Home Run on the Keys
Jack Bales, "1932 World Series," WrigleyIvy.com.

World Series games
1932 Major League Baseball season
Called shot
New York Yankees postseason
Chicago Cubs postseason
October 1932 sports events
1932 in sports in Illinois
1930s in Chicago
Historic baseball plays
Baseball competitions in Chicago